"Beat" is the fourth single from Japanese pop singer Kaela Kimura. It was released as the second single from her album, Circle, on October 5, 2005.  It peaked at #7 on the Oricon charts.

Track listing
"Beat"
"ROCK ON"
"Beat" (Instrumental)
"ROCK ON" (Instrumental)

References

2005 singles
Kaela Kimura songs
Japanese-language songs
2005 songs
Songs written by Tamio Okuda